The Treaty of Constantinople was signed on January 25, 1479, which officially ended the fifteen-year war between the Republic of Venice and the Ottoman Empire. The agreement was established as a result of the Ottomans having reached the outskirts  of Venice. Based on the terms of the treaty, the Venetians were allowed to keep Ulcinj, Antivan, and Durrës. However, they ceded Shkodra (which had been besieged by the Ottomans for many months), as well as other territories on the Dalmatian coastline, and relinquished control of the Greek islands of Negroponte (Euboea) and Lemnos. Moreover, the Venetians were forced to pay 100,000 ducat indemnity and agreed to a tribute of around 10,000 ducats per year in order to acquire trading privileges in the Black Sea. As a result of this treaty, Venice acquired a weakened position in the Levant.

See also
 List of treaties
 Turkish–Venetian Wars

References

Further reading
 Diana Gilliland Wright, Pierre A. MacKay, "When the Serenissima and the Gran Turco made Love: the Peace Treaty of 1478" Studi Veneziani, vol. LIII, pp. 261–277

Sources
 The Encyclopedia of World History (2001) – Venice

Constantinople 1479
Constantinople 1479
15th century in Istanbul
Constantinople
1479 in the Ottoman Empire
1479 in Europe
15th century in the Republic of Venice
Ottoman Empire–Republic of Venice relations